Barun Das may refer to:

 Barun Das (cricketer)
 Barun Das (business professional)